The discography of Australian pop and jazz singer-songwriter Renée Geyer. By 1982, Geyer had five albums certified gold in Australia.

Albums

Studio albums

Live albums

Compilation albums

Soundtrack albums

Box Set

Singles

As lead or featured artist

Other singles

See also
 Sun 1972 by Sun (1972)
 Easy Pieces by Easy Pieces (1988)

References

Discographies of Australian artists
Pop music discographies
Rhythm and blues discographies